Salsbury Cove is an unincorporated village in the town of Bar Harbor, Hancock County, Maine, United States. Salsbury Cove has a post office with ZIP code 04672.

References

Villages in Hancock County, Maine
Villages in Maine